Bibiana Muñoz (born 24 February 1971) is a Colombian weightlifter.

She competed at the 1998 International Weightlifting Federation University World Cup. 1999 World Weightlifting Championships, and  1999 Pan American Games,

References 

Living people
1971 births